The 20973/20974 Ajmer – Rameswaram Humsafar Express is an express train of the Indian Railways connecting  with . It is currently being operated with 20973/20974 train numbers on a weekly basis.

Background 
At present, It is the only train which is running between Indore to Southern Part of Tamil Nadu.

Rakes 

The service is completely fitted with 3-tier AC coaches designed by Indian Railways with features like LED screen display to show information about stations, train speed and will have announcement system as well, Vending machines for tea, coffee and milk, Bio toilets in compartments as well as CCTV cameras. Apart from 16 AC 3-tier coaches earmarked for passengers, the train will also have 1 Pantry Car and 2 End-on Generator coaches.

Service & Stoppage
On the return journey, it leaves the same Tuesday traverses the same route and reaches Ajmer Junction on Thursdays.

Demands
There are also demands for this train to make a stop at Ramanathapuram, Paramakudi, Sivagangai Karaikudi Junction, Pudukkottai and Vriddhachalam Junction. as this train runs with low patronage between Chennai Egmore and Rameswaram.

See also 

 Sri Ganganagar – Tiruchirappalli Humsafar Express
 Ajmer Junction railway station
 Rameswaram railway station

Notes

References

External links 
19603/Ajmer - Rameswaram Humsafar Express
19604/Rameswaram - Ajmer Humsafar Express

Transport in Ajmer
Transport in Rameswaram
Railway services introduced in 2018
Humsafar Express trains
Rail transport in Andhra Pradesh
Rail transport in Rajasthan
Rail transport in Telangana
Rail transport in Madhya Pradesh
Rail transport in Maharashtra
Rail transport in Tamil Nadu